Platno Lake is the 410 m long in southwest–northeast direction and 170 m wide lake on Long Beach, Nelson Island in the South Shetland Islands, Antarctica. It has a surface area of 4.2 ha and is separated from the waters of Bransfield Strait by a 40 to 110 m wide strip of land. The area was visited by early 19th century sealers.

The feature is so named because of its shape supposedly resembling a sail ('platno' in Bulgarian).

Location
British mapping of the area in 1968.

Maps
 Livingston Island to King George Island. Scale 1:200000. Admiralty Nautical Chart 1776. Taunton: UK Hydrographic Office, 1968
 South Shetland Islands. Scale 1:200000 topographic map No. 3373. DOS 610 - W 62 58. Tolworth, UK, 1968
 Antarctic Digital Database (ADD). Scale 1:250000 topographic map of Antarctica. Scientific Committee on Antarctic Research (SCAR). Since 1993, regularly upgraded and updated

Notes

References
 Bulgarian Antarctic Gazetteer. Antarctic Place-names Commission. (details in Bulgarian, basic data in English)

External links
 Platno Lake. Adjusted Copernix satellite image

Lakes of the South Shetland Islands
Bulgaria and the Antarctic